Hacienda Kancabchén (also known as Kancabchén Gamboa) is located in the Baca Municipality in the state of Yucatán in southeastern Mexico. It is one of the properties that arose during the nineteenth century henequen boom. There are numerous other properties of this name in the Yucatán including Hacienda Kancabchén (Halachó), Hacienda Kancabchén (Homún), Hacienda Kancabchén (Motul), Hacienda Kankabchén (Seyé), Hacienda Kankabchén (Tixkokob), Hacienda Kancabchén (Tunkás), Hacienda Kancabchén Ucí and Hacienda Kancabchén de Valencia.

Toponymy
The name (Kancabchén) is a word from the Mayan language meaning the well of the red ground.

How to get there
The property is located 22km from Mérida to the east of the Periférico off Carretera Mérida-Motul south of Baca.

History

In either 1890 or 1912, Pascual Gamboa Rivero built Hacienda Kancabchén to engage in livestock and henequen activity. The property was inherited by his daughter, Josefina Gamboa de Casares, who kept it in her possession until 1985. In 1985 the property was sold to the Ponce Garcia family for a dairy farm and a get-away retreat.

Architecture
The property was built in the style of the colonial haciendas. The facade features three arches along the portico. There is a belfry and a large clock on top of the building. Principal house is decorated with fine wall paintings and has large rooms, high ceilings and large windows. It is built on two levels, with 8 bedrooms, kitchen, breakfast area, library, living room, bathrooms and a casino.

The property also features a chapel, whose patron is St. Anthony of Padua, which has the capacity for 200 people. There is a zoo, garden, stables, rodeo arena and casino area complementing the gardens. The property can accommodate up to 600 people for private events.

References

Bibliography
 Bracamonte, P and Solís, R., Los espacios de autonomía maya, Ed. UADY, Mérida, 1997.
 Gobierno del Estado de Yucatán, "Los municipios de Yucatán", 1988.
 Kurjack, Edward y Silvia Garza, Atlas arqueológico del Estado de Yucatán, Ed. INAH, 1980.
 Patch, Robert, La formación de las estancias y haciendas en Yucatán durante la colonia, Ed. UADY, 1976.
 Peón Ancona, J. F., "Las antiguas haciendas de Yucatán", en Diario de Yucatán, Mérida, 1971.

External links
Photographs of Kancabchén

Populated places in Yucatán
Haciendas of Yucatán
Agave production